Sokun Nisa (born 1 May 1983) is a Cambodian singer and actress. In 2003, she started her career as a singer with Rasmey Steung Sangke Production. Currently she is a singer under Rasmey Hang Meas Production. 

In 2017, she made her acting debut on television in a remake of Korean drama Autumn in My Heart as Lead Actress of the series.

Discography

Solo albums

Filmography

Television series

Music video (drama)

Television show

Live performances

Awards

References

"Singer Who Didn’t Read Pushes Reading". The Phnom Penh Post. Retrieved September 27, 2015.

External links
 
 

1983 births
Living people
21st-century Cambodian women singers
21st-century Cambodian actresses
Cambodian television actresses